In mathematics, Hanner's inequalities are results in the theory of Lp spaces. Their proof was published in 1956 by Olof Hanner. They provide a simpler way of proving the uniform convexity of Lp spaces for p ∈ (1, +∞) than the approach proposed by James A. Clarkson in 1936.

Statement of the inequalities
Let f, g ∈ Lp(E), where E is any measure space. If p ∈ [1, 2], then

The substitutions F = f + g and G = f − g yield the second of Hanner's inequalities:

For p ∈ [2, +∞) the inequalities are reversed (they remain non-strict).

Note that for  the inequalities become equalities which are both the parallelogram rule.

References
  
  

Banach spaces
Inequalities
Measure theory